The Bigger Lovers were an American power pop band from Philadelphia, Pennsylvania, United States.  The band featured Bret Tobias (singer/guitarist), Ed Hogarty (guitarist), Scott Jefferson (bassist), and Patrick Berkery (drummer).

They played their farewell show on November 5, 2005.

Discography
How I Learned to Stop Worrying (2001)
Honey in the Hive (2002, Yep Roc)
This Affair Never Happened (2004, Yep Roc)

References

  

American power pop groups
Yep Roc Records artists

Official website